Ben Golden McCollum (1909 – August 12, 1963) was an outlaw in Oklahoma during the 1920s who was nicknamed the "Sheik of Boynton". McCollum robbed banks in both Prague, Oklahoma (where he got away with US$3400) and Checotah, Oklahoma ($4700) in 1929. He was captured on the streets of Boynton, Oklahoma shortly after the Checotah heist.

Background
McCollum was convicted of both bank robberies and sentenced to a forty-year term at the Oklahoma State Penitentiary in McAlester, Oklahoma. On April 15, 1934, McCollum knifed two fellow inmates to death in a dispute over a card game. He was originally sentenced to death for the murders, but the sentence was later reduced to a life term. McCollum escaped prison in 1954 and was added to the FBI Ten Most Wanted Fugitives list on January 4, 1957. He was captured on March 7, 1958 in a rooming house in Indianapolis, Indiana and returned to McAlester. McCollum was paroled in 1961, at which time he relocated to Marcum, Kentucky.

McCollum was shotgunned to death at his home by a pair of youthful burglars on the night of August 12, 1963, whose identities are unknown.

See also 
List of unsolved murders

Books

 
 
 Daily Oklahoman and Muskogee Phoenix...Numerous articles from 1929—1934---1954-1958-
 Personal Interview with nephew of Ben Golden "Goldie" McCollum in Fall 2007

References

1963 deaths
1963 murders in the United States
American bank robbers
American escapees
FBI Ten Most Wanted Fugitives
Fugitives
Male murder victims
Criminals from Oklahoma
Unsolved murders in the United States
Deaths by firearm in Kentucky
People murdered in Kentucky
1909 births